Cseh ("Czech" in Hungarian) is a surname. Notable people with the surname include:

Andreo Cseh (1895–1979), Hungarian/Dutch Roman Catholic priest and Esperantist 
Anna Marie Cseh (born 1977), Hungarian actress and model
Ervin Cseh (1838–1918), Hungarian politician
Ferenc Cseh (1943–2018), Hungarian sprint kayaker 
Gábor Cseh (1916–1979), Hungarian sprint canoeist
Katalin Cseh (born 1988), Canadian-born Hungarian physician and politician
László Cseh (born 1985), Hungarian swimmer
László Cseh (footballer) (1910–1950), Hungarian footballer
László Cseh Sr. (1952–2020), Hungarian swimmer
Martin Cseh (born 1988), Slovak footballer
Tamás Cseh (1943–2009), Hungarian composer, singer and actor

See also
 

Hungarian-language surnames
Surnames of Slavic origin